Bakov nad Jizerou is a town in Mladá Boleslav District in the Central Bohemian Region of the Czech Republic. It has about 5,000 inhabitants.

Administrative parts
Villages and hamlets of Brejlov, Buda, Chudoplesy, Horka, Klokočka, Malá Bělá, Malý Rečkov, Podhradí, Studénka, Velký Rečkov, Zájezdy and Zvířetice are administrative parts of Bakov nad Jizerou.

Etymology
The name Bakov is derived from the name of its probable founder, a man named Bak.

Geography
Most of the municipal territory lies in the Jičín Uplands, but it also extends to the Jizera Table on the west. The town proper is situated on the left bank of the Jizera River, at its confluence with the Kněžmostka Stream.

History

Bakov nad Jizerou was probably founded during the colonization of Bohemia at the turn of the 12th and 13th centuries. The first written mention of Bakov is from 1345, when it was bought from the Hradiště Monastery by Markvart of Zvířetice. He made it the centre of the Zvířetice estate. The village survived the Hussite Wars unscathed and continued to develop. In 1497, Bakov was promoted to a town.

In 1643, during the Thirty Years' War, Bakov was burned down by the Swedish army. During the second half of the 17th century, the town gradually recovered. Bakov also regularly suffered from floods, so in 1753 the bed of the Jizera was diverted further away from the town.

Bakov was traditionally an agricultural settlement. From the 16th to the 18th century, pottery was an important source of livelihood for the inhabitants. From the end of the 17th century, knitting from bulrush was a characteristic craft for the town.

Demographics

Transport
The D10 motorway from Prague to Turnov runs next to the town.

Bakov nad Jizerou is located on two regional railway lines: Prague–Tanvald and Nymburk–Turnov.

Sights

The landmark of the town centre is the Church of Saint Bartholomew. A wooden chapel, which was as old as Bakov, was rebuilt into a stone Gothic church in 1384. After the fire in 1643, it was completely rebuilt in the second half of the 17th century, and was equipped with new bells.

The Holy Trinity Column in the middle of the town square was built in 1727–1729.

The most important monument is the ruin of the Zvířetice Castle. Originally, it was a Gothic castle built before 1287. At the end of the 16th century, it was rebuilt into a Renaissance residence. In 1693, it was damaged by fire and partly reconstructed. After the second fire in 1720, it became a ruin. Today, the ruin is a tourist destination and offers sightseeing tours.

Notable people
Jiří Ignác Linek (1725–1791), composer

Gallery

References

External links

Cities and towns in the Czech Republic
Populated places in Mladá Boleslav District